Zakharov is a rural locality (a khutor) and the administrative center of Zakharovskoye Rural Settlement, Kletsky District, Volgograd Oblast, Russia. The population was 623 as of 2010. There are 12 streets.

Geography 
Zakharov is located 24 km southwest of Kletskaya (the district's administrative centre) by road. Yevstratovsky is the nearest rural locality.

References 

Rural localities in Kletsky District